Ratan Sil Sarma is an Indian film director. He is associated with Assamese Cinema and Hindi Cinema.

Career 
He started his career as film editor. He edited the films like Gangs of North East, Dham Dhama Dham and Kokaideu Bindaas. In 2016, he made his directing debut with Assamese film Marksheet for which he received several awards in Prag Cine Awards. In 2020, he directed Hindi film Pepper Chicken.

Filmography

Awards and nominations

References 

Indian film directors
Year of birth missing (living people)
Living people
Film directors from Assam